Although a wide variety of bird species have been shown to contract and spread Influenza A virus subtype H5N1, from waterfowl to poultry and birds of prey, mammalian infections have been of particular interest to researchers due to their potential to develop mutations that increase the risk of mammal-to-mammal spread and transmission to and among humans. 

Other influenza strains are common among mammals, including humans, but this list only shows those who have been proven to carry H5N1. In October 2022, mink became the first detected mammal able to engage in mammal-to-mammal spread of H5N1.

See also 
 Influenza A virus
 Avian influenza
 Swine influenza
 COVID-19 pandemic and animals
 Cross-species transmission

References

External links 
 USDA APHIS: 2022-2023 Detections of Highly Pathogenic Avian Influenza in Mammals

Further reading 
 HHS U.S. Department of Health & Human Services's Pandemic Influenza Plan

 
H5N1
Disease ecology
H5N1
Infectious disease-related lists